The Douglas D-906 was a paper project for a heavy lift transport by the Douglas Aircraft Company.

Douglas spent four years studying a heavy lift logistics aircraft capable of moving outsize payloads and Army units, for which no capability existed, under the CX-4 and Experimental Cargo-Heavy Logistics Support (CX-HLS) programs, which ultimately produced the C-5. The D-906 was one of them.

With a shoulder wing and six -thrust turbofans, it superficially resembled the Antonov An-225.

Length was to be , span , and wing area  .

Sources
 Francillon, René J. McDonnell Douglas aircraft since 1920. New York: Putnam, 1979. Page 718.
This page uses content originally created here.

Cancelled military aircraft projects of the United States
D-906
Six-engined jet aircraft
High-wing aircraft